Eupithecia erecticoma is a moth in the family Geometridae first described by William Warren in 1907. It is found in Peru.

References

Moths described in 1907
erecticoma
Moths of South America